The Changhe Z-18, also known as Z-8G, is a medium-lift transport helicopter developed by Changhe Aircraft Industries Corporation (CAIC) to replace the Changhe/Harbin Z-8.

Design and development
The Z-18 is a development of the Avicopter AC313 and Changhe/Harbin Z-8, both of which are developments of the Aérospatiale SA 321 Super Frelon.

Notable changes include a redesigned lower fuselage similar to the AC313 which results in larger internal space. It also reportedly makes greater use of titanium and composites in its rotor blades and rotor, and replaces the Z-8's boat-shaped lower fuselage with a tail ramp for small vehicles. It has a glass cockpit and is powered by three WZ-6C turboshafts.

The Z-18's maximum takeoff weight (MTOW) is 13.8 tonnes. In late-2014, the only People's Liberation Army Navy (PLAN) ships able to operate the helicopter at MTOW were aircraft carriers and large amphibious assault ships.

Operational history
The Z-18F anti-submarine warfare (ASW) version was undergoing testing by the end of August 2014.

The army transport Z-18A first appeared in Chinese state media in December 2014, and reportedly underwent high-altitude testing on the Tibetan Plateau in January 2015. The Z-18A reached an altitude of  during testing.

The Z-18A was in service with the People's Liberation Army Ground Force (PLAGF) by January 2018.

Variants
Z-18: Naval transport variant with folding tail boom and rotor blades. Features a nosed mounted weather radar and FLIR/TV turret.
Z-18A / Z-8G: Transport variant with extended nose expected to replace Z-8A/B. Features a nose mounted terrain-following radar. Multiple subvariants with differing equipment configurations such as: SATCOM fairing on tailboom, flare/chaff launchers + MAWS/RWR/LWR sensors on fuselage and sponsons, QJH001 machine gun on side door, ECM equipment on fuselage, retractable SAR radar replacing rear ramp etc.
Z-8L: Transport variant with wide-body fuselage and enlarged fuel sponsons, first spotted in January 2019. The internal width of the load area has been increased from 1.8m to 2.4 m, making it larger than old Z-8 and SA321 variants. Features a nose mounted terrain-following radar. Multiple subvariants with differing equipment configurations such as: SATCOM fairing on tailboom, flare launchers + LWR/RWR sensors on sponsons, RWR/MAWS sensors on front fuselage, roof mounted FLIR etc.
Z-18F: ASW variant with chin-mounted surface search radar, dipping sonar, and may be equipped with up to four lightweight torpedoes and 32 sonobuoys.
Z-18J: Airborne early warning (AEW) variant, with a lowerable radar antenna in place of the ramp.

Operators

People's Liberation Army Ground Force (Z-18A)

Specifications (Z-18F)

See also

References

Changhe aircraft
Military transport helicopters
2010s Chinese helicopters
2010s Chinese military utility aircraft
Three-turbine helicopters
Aircraft first flown in 2014